A barangay (abbreviated as Brgy. or Bgy.), historically referred to as barrio (abbreviated as Bo.), is the smallest administrative division in the Philippines and is the native Filipino term for a village, district, or ward. In metropolitan areas, the term often refers to an inner city neighborhood, a suburb, or a suburban neighborhood or even a borough. The word barangay originated from balangay, a type of boat used by a group of Austronesian peoples when they migrated to the Philippines.

Municipalities and cities in the Philippines are politically subdivided into barangays, with the exception of the municipalities of Adams in Ilocos Norte and Kalayaan in Palawan, with each containing a single barangay. Barangays are sometimes informally subdivided into smaller areas called purok, or barangay zones consisting of a cluster of houses for organizational purposes, and sitios, which are territorial enclaves—usually rural—far from the barangay center. , there are 42,047 barangays throughout the Philippines.

History 
 
When the first Spaniards arrived in the Philippines in the 16th century, they found well-organized independent villages called barangays. The name barangay originated from balangay, a certain type of traditional boat in many languages in the Philippines. Early Spanish dictionaries of Philippine languages make it clear that balangay was pronounced "ba-la-ngay", while today the modern barangay is pronounced "ba-rang-gay". The term referred to the people serving under a particular chief, rather than to the modern meaning of an area of land, for which other words were used. While barangay is a Tagalog word, it spread throughout the Philippines as Spanish rule concentrated power in Manila.

All citations regarding pre-colonial barangay lead to a single source, Juan de Plascencia's 1589 report Las costumbres de los indios Tagalos de Filipinas. However, historian Damon Woods challenges the concept of barangay as an indigenous political organization primarily due to lack of linguistic evidence. Based on indigenous language documents, Tagalogs did not use the word barangay to describe themselves or their communities. Instead, barangay is argued as a Spanish invention from an attempt by the Spaniards in reconstructing pre-conquest Tagalog society.

The first barangays started as relatively small communities of around 50 to 100 families. By the time of contact with Spaniards, many barangays have developed into large communities. The encomienda of 1604 shows that many affluent and powerful coastal barangays in Sulu, Butuan, Panay, Leyte and Cebu, Pampanga, Pangasinan, Pasig, Laguna, and Cagayan River were flourishing trading centers. Some of these barangays had large populations. In Panay, some barangays had 20,000 inhabitants; in Leyte (Baybay), 15,000 inhabitants; in Cebu, 3,500 residents; in Vitis (Pampanga), 7,000 inhabitants; Pangasinan, 4,000 residents. There were smaller barangays with fewer number of people. But these were generally inland communities; or if they were coastal, they were not located in areas which were good for business pursuits. These smaller barangays had around thirty to one hundred houses only, and the population varied from one hundred to five hundred persons. According to Legazpi, he founded communities with only twenty to thirty people.

Traditionally, the original "barangays" were coastal settlements of the migration of these Malayo-Polynesian people (who came to the archipelago) from other places in Southeast Asia (see chiefdom). Most of the ancient barangays were coastal or riverine. This is because most of the people were relying on fishing for their supply of protein and their livelihood. They also traveled mostly by water up and down rivers, and along the coasts. Trails always followed river systems, which were also a major source of water for bathing, washing, and drinking.

The coastal barangays were more accessible to trade with foreigners. These were ideal places for economic activity to develop. Business with traders from other countries also meant contact with other cultures and civilizations, such as those of Japan, Han Chinese, Indian people, and Arab people. These coastal communities acquired more cosmopolitan cultures, with developed social structures (sovereign principalities), ruled by established royalties and nobilities.

During the Spanish rule, through a resettlement policy called reducción, smaller scattered barangays were consolidated (and thus, "reduced") to form compact towns. Each barangay was headed by the cabeza de barangay (barangay chief), who formed part of the principalía – the elite ruling class of the municipalities of the Spanish Philippines. This position was inherited from the first datus, and came to be known as such during the Spanish regime. The Spanish monarch ruled each barangay through the cabeza, who also collected taxes (called tribute) from the residents for the Spanish Crown.

When the Americans arrived, "slight changes in the structure of local government was effected". Later, Rural Councils with four councilors were created to assist, now renamed Barrio Lieutenant; it was later renamed Barrio Council, and then Barangay Council.

The Spanish term barrio (abbr. "Bo.") was used for much of the 20th century. Mayor Ramon Bagatsing of the City of Manila established the first Barangay Bureau in the Philippines, creating the blueprint for the barangay system as the basic socio-political unit for the city in the early 70s. This was quickly replicated by the national government, and in 1974 President Ferdinand Marcos ordered the renaming of barrios to barangays. The name survived the 1986 EDSA Revolution, though older people would still use the term barrio. The Municipal Council was abolished upon transfer of powers to the barangay system. Marcos used to call the barangay part of Philippine participatory democracy, and most of his writings involving the New Society praised the role of baranganic democracy in nation-building.

After the 1986 EDSA Revolution and the drafting of the 1987 Constitution, the Municipal Council was restored, making the barangay the smallest unit of Philippine government. The first barangay elections held under the new constitution was held on March 28, 1989, under Republic Act No. 6679.

The last barangay elections were held in October 2013. Barangay elections scheduled in October 2017 were postponed following the signing of Republic Act No. 10952. The postponement has been criticized by election watchdogs and in both the Philippine Congress and Senate. The Parish Pastoral Council for Responsible Voting considers the postponement a move that would "only deny the people their rights to choose their leaders."

Organization 

The modern barangay is headed by elected officials, the topmost being the punong barangay or the barangay chairperson (addressed as kapitan; also known as the barangay captain). The kapitan is aided by the Sangguniang Barangay (Barangay Council) whose members, called barangay kagawad ("councilors"), are also elected.

The council is considered to be a local government unit (LGU), similar to the provincial and the municipal government. The officials that make up the council are the punong barangay, seven barangay councilors, and the chairman of the Youth Council or the Sangguniang Kabataan (SK). Thus, there are eight members of the Legislative Council in a barangay.

The council is in session for a new solution or a resolution of bill votes, and if the counsels and the SK are at tie decision, the barangay captain uses their vote. This only happens when the SK which is sometimes stopped and continued. In absence of an SK, the council votes for a nominated Barangay Council president, and this president is not like the League of the Barangay Councilors, which is composed of barangay captains of a municipality.

The Barangay Justice System or Katarungang Pambarangay is composed of members commonly known as lupon tagapamayapa (justice of the peace). Their function is to conciliate and mediate disputes at the barangay level to avoid legal action and relieve the courts of docket congestion.

Barangay elections are non-partisan and are typically hotly contested. Barangay captains are elected by first-past-the-post plurality (no runoff voting). Councilors are elected by plurality-at-large voting with the entire barangay as a single at-large district. Each voter can vote up to seven candidates for councilor, with the winners being the seven candidates with the most votes. Typically, a ticket usually consists of one candidate for barangay captain and seven candidates for the councilors. Elections for the post of punong barangay and the barangay kagawads are usually held every three years starting from 2007.

The barangay is often governed from its seat of local government, the barangay hall.

A tanod, or barangay police officer, is an unarmed watchman who fulfills policing functions within the barangay. The number of barangay tanods differs from one barangay to another; they help maintain law and order in the neighborhoods throughout the Philippines.

Funding for the barangay comes from their share of the Internal Revenue Allotment (IRA) with a portion of the allotment set aside for the Sangguniang Kabataan. The exact amount of money is determined by a formula combining the barangay's population and land area.

See also 

 Poblacion
 Barrio
 Association of Barangay Captains
 Balangay
 Barangay Health Volunteers
 Purok
 Sitio
 Unincorporated community, a similar phenomenon in the United States and Canada

Bibliography 
 Constantino, Renato. (1975) The Philippines: A Past Revisited (volume 1). 
 Mamuel Merino, O.S.A., ed., Conquistas de las Islas Filipinas (1565–1615), Madrid: Consejo Superior de Investigaciones Cientificas, 1975.

Notes

References

External links 
Katarungang Pambarangay Handbook

.
Local government in the Philippines
Subdivisions of the Philippines
Human habitats
Tagalog words and phrases
Types of administrative division